Morning Star is an album by flautist Hubert Laws released on the CTI and recorded at Rudy Van Gelder's studio in 1972.

Reception
The Allmusic review by Thom Jurek awarded the album 4 stars stating "Morning Star is a joy all the way through... It's Laws at his very best; it helped define the essence of CTI".

Track listing
All compositions by Hubert Laws except where noted
 "Morning Star" (Rodgers Grant) - 7:57 
 "Let Her Go" - 4:53 
 "Where Is The Love" (Ralph MacDonald, William Salter) - 4:36 
 "No More" - 5:01 
 "Amazing Grace" (Traditional) - 7:19 
 "What Do You Think of This World Now?" - 6:00

Personnel
Hubert Laws - flute, alto flute, bass flute, piccolo
Alan Rubin, Marvin Stamm - trumpet, flugelhorn
Garnett Brown - trombone
James Buffington - French horn
Phil Bodner - clarinet, flute, alto flute
Romeo Penque - flute, alto flute, bass flute, piccolo, English horn
Jack Knitzer - bassoon
Bob James - electric piano
John Tropea - guitar
Ron Carter - bass
Billy Cobham - drums 
Dave Friedman - vibraphone, percussion
Ralph MacDonald - percussion
Harry Cykman, Max Ellen, Paul Gershman, Emanuel Green, Harry Lookofsky, David Nadien, Gene Orloff, Elliot Rosoff, Irving Spice - violin
George Koutzen, Charles McCracken, Lucien Schmit - cello
Gloria Agostini - harp
Lani Groves, Eloise Laws, Debra Laws, Tasha Thomas - vocal 
Don Sebesky - arranger, conductor

References

1972 albums
CTI Records albums
Hubert Laws albums
Albums produced by Creed Taylor
Albums arranged by Don Sebesky
Albums recorded at Van Gelder Studio